Rāfiʿ ibn al Layth ibn Naṣr ibn Sayyār was a Khurasani Arab noble who led a large-scale rebellion against the Abbasid Caliphate in 806–809.

He was the grandson of the last Umayyad governor of Khurasan, Nasr ibn Sayyar. His father Layth was likely the "mawla of the amir al-mu'minin" whom Caliph al-Mansur sent as an envoy to the Turkish ruler of Farghana. According to al-Baladhuri, Rafi served as a garrison commander in Samarkand. 

In 796, Caliph Harun al-Rashid appointed a prominent member of the Abbasid elites, Ali ibn Isa ibn Mahan, as the governor of Khurasan. Ali's ruthless exploitation of the province and oppressive fiscal measures caused much resentment among the local elites, as well as outbreaks of Kharijite uprisings. In April 805, a more and more complaints reached Harun, he went to Rayy to inspect the situation for himself. However, when Ali came and presented himself before the Caliph, he brought with him an enormous treasure in precious objects—worth 30 million gold dinars according to one source—which he liberally distributed to the Caliph's entourage and family. As a result, Harun not only kept him in place, but even accompanied him for part of his return journey, a rare mark of honour. 

Consequently, when in 806 Rafi launched a revolt in Samarkand, it spread quickly across Khurasan, finding support both among the Arabs and the Iranian natives. Rafi also secured the support of the Oghuz and Karluk Turks.

Harun al-Rashid dismissed Ali and replaced him with Harthama ibn A'yan, and in 808 marched himself east to deal with the situation, but died in March 809 while at Tus. After Harun's death, Rafi' chose to surrender himself to Harun's son and new governor of Khurasan, al-Ma'mun. He was pardoned, and nothing more is known of him after.

Footnotes

References

Sources 
 

 
 
 

8th-century births
9th-century deaths
9th-century Arabs
Khurasan under the Abbasid Caliphate
Arab rebels
Rebels from the Abbasid Caliphate
9th-century people from the Abbasid Caliphate
800s conflicts